Airheads is a 1994 American comedy film written by Rich Wilkes, directed by Michael Lehmann, and starring Brendan Fraser, Steve Buscemi, Adam Sandler, Chris Farley, Ernie Hudson, Michael McKean, Harold Ramis, Judd Nelson, Michael Richards, Amy Locane and Joe Mantegna. It tells the story of a band of loser musicians who stage a hijacking of a radio station in order to get airplay for their demo recording.

The film was met with negative reviews and performed poorly at the box office.

Plot
 
Chazz, Rex, and Pip are in the LA hard rock band "The Lone Rangers" who are continuously turned down as they try to get their demo tape heard by record producers like Jimmie Wing. After scolding him for being lazy, Chazz's girlfriend Kayla kicks him out of her apartment. 

The Lone Rangers try to get the local rock station KPPX to play their reel-to-reel tape on the air trying to break-in through the back door. After several unsuccessful attempts, station employee Suzzi comes out to smoke and they keep the door from shutting behind her.

Once inside, laid back DJ Ian "The Shark" talks with them on the air. Station manager Milo overhears them and intervenes but Ian continues broadcasting. After Milo insults Rex by calling him "Hollywood Boulevard trash," he and Chazz pull out realistic-looking water pistols filled with hot sauce and demand airplay. After setting up an old reel-to-reel for the demo, the tape begins to play but is quickly destroyed when the player malfunctions. The guys try to run, but Doug Beech had already called the police and they see the building is surrounded.

They negotiate with the police who are now tasked to find Kayla who has a cassette of the demo. Since the station never went off the air, news of the hostage crisis travels quickly and numerous fans begin showing up outside the radio station interfering with police. A SWAT team has also arrived where Carl Mace prefers using force over negotiation tactics by Sergeant O'Malley. His team secretly passes a gun through a roof vent to Beech who has been hiding in the air ducts. During the crisis, it is revealed that Milo had secretly signed a deal to change KPPX's format to Adult Contemporary which includes having to fire Ian and most of the other employees. When this comes out, Ian and a few employees side with the band and turn against Milo.

The police find Kayla who arrives at the radio station to deliver the tape. However, the tape is damaged because she threw it out of the car earlier. Chazz and Kayla get into an argument that quickly escalates and results in the studio console being destroyed, dashing any hopes to play the tape on the air.

As some of the items the band demanded from police are brought into the station, the door shuts on Rex's plastic gun revealing it to be fake. Seeing this, some of the hostages run out with one telling the SWAT team the band's guns are not real. As the team assembles to storm the station, Beech corners the band from a low hanging air vent. Knowing he no longer will have a job at the station, Ian knocks down Beech's gun. This causes the weapon to wildly fire several rounds and the police are forced to back off. Ian picks up the gun but gives it to a somewhat confused Chazz in a final act of anti-establishment rebellion.

Jimmie Wing comes to the radio station and offers the band a contract. They reluctantly agree to the deal knowing they have no more options. Wing arranges an entire stage and sound system to be airlifted to the roof where the band will play their song for the now huge crowd outside. To the band's dismay, they find only the PA system is real and everything else is just props. Refusing to lip sync as their tape is played, they instead destroy their instruments in protest to the delight of the crowd and stage dive into the hands of the cheering audience that O'Malley has his men let through.

The Lone Rangers are later seen playing a gig in prison where they are incarcerated as Kayla and Suzzi dance in the background. The concert is shown live on MTV. Now their manager, Ian says on the phone to an unknown person that The Lone Rangers will start touring in six months or "three months if they behave themselves".

A postscript states that The Lone Rangers served three months for kidnapping, theft, and assault with hot pepper sauce with their album LIVE IN PRISON going triple platinum.

Cast
Main

Cameos
 The band Galactic Cowboys perform in the film under the name "The Sons of Thunder".
 Mike Judge voices Beavis and Butt-Head, who call in to the radio station during the hostage situation and end up infuriating the Lone Rangers with their comments.
 White Zombie appear in the bar scene with Officer Wilson is searching for Amy Locane, playing the track they recorded for the film "Feed the Gods".
 Lemmy Kilmister makes a brief appearance in the crowd outside the radio station as the editor of his school magazine.

Production

Casting
Metallica, Cannibal Corpse and Testament were approached for the bar scene but declined to appear. Director Michael Lehmann did not want Brendan Fraser in the role of Chazz as he could not see him getting past his role as Link in Encino Man. When Adam Sandler found out, he went to his house at four in the morning and threatened to walk from the film if Fraser was not cast. Lehmann immediately changed his mind after meeting him.

Location 
The KPPX radio station was located at Fox Plaza in Los Angeles, which served as Nakatomi Plaza in the 1988 film Die Hard.

Music
The film features an original song by White Zombie and went on to chart on the Billboard 200 and peak at Number 157. In addition, there are re-recordings of songs from Motorhead and Primus. Jay Yuenger and Sean Yseult also accompanied with Brendan Fraser's vocal rendition of "Degenerated", a song by hardcore punk band Reagan Youth. The song was produced by Yuenger and Bryan Carlstrom.

A number of songs can be heard in the film but not included on the soundtrack album. These are: "Baby Huey (Do You Wanna Dance)" by Dim Stars; "Shamrocks and Shenanigans (Boom Shalock Lock Boom) [Butch Vig Mix]" by House of Pain; "Unsatisfied" by The Replacements; "Rocks" by Primal Scream; "Janie's Got a Gun" by Aerosmith; "Wheezing" by David Byrne; "Don't Hate Me Because I'm Beautiful" by "Sons of Thunder" (Galactic Cowboys).

Reception

Box office
The film debuted in tenth place, grossing US$1.9 million in its opening weekend, grossing only half its budget.

Critical response
On Rotten Tomatoes the film has an approval rating of 29% based on 38 reviews. The site's critical consensus states: "There's a biting satire that keeps threatening to burst out of the well-cast Airheads, but unfortunately, the end result lives down to its title in the most unfortunate ways." On Metacritic, the film has a score of 46 out of 100, based on 18 critics, indicating "mixed or average reviews". Audiences polled by CinemaScore gave the film an average grade of "B-" on an A+ to F scale.

Peter Travers of Rolling Stone gave the film a rare positive review: "Fraser and Buscemi are deadpan delights. And Sandler, Opera Man on SNL, is a red-hot screen find."

Year-end lists 
 9th worst – Sean P. Means, The Salt Lake Tribune
 Top 18 worst (alphabetically listed, not ranked) – Michael Mills, The Palm Beach Post
 Dishonorable mention – Dan Craft, The Pantagraph

Soundtrack

References

External links

 
 

1994 films
1990s buddy comedy films
1990s crime comedy films
American buddy comedy films
American crime comedy films
American satirical films
American rock music films
Beavis and Butt-Head
Films scored by Carter Burwell
Films about radio people
Films directed by Michael Lehmann
Films produced by Robert Simonds
Films set in Los Angeles
Heavy metal films
1994 comedy films
20th Century Fox films
1990s English-language films
1990s American films